Jacob Ashby is an American politician and occupational therapist from the state of New York. A Republican, Ashby represents the 43rd district in the New York State Senate since 2023.

Career
Ashby has worked as an occupational therapist for 14 years, operating his own practice from 2014 until his election to the Assembly. He is a former Captain in the United States Army Reserve, serving for eight years and completing tours in Afghanistan and Iraq.

In 2022, Ashby ran for the newly created 43rd district in the New York State Senate and won.

Electoral history
Ashby was elected to the Rensselaer County Legislature for the 4th district in 2017. Soon after taking office, he announced his campaign for the State Assembly's 107th district, which had been represented by Steven McLaughlin until his election as Rensselaer County Executive. In a close special election in April 2018, Ashby defeated Democratic county legislator Cynthia Doran with 51% of the vote.

Ashby won a similarly close election that November, defeating Democrat Tistrya Houghtling with 51% of the vote.

Personal life
Ashby lives in Castleton-on-Hudson with his wife, Kristy, and their two children, a son and a daughter.

References

Living people
People from Rensselaer County, New York
Politicians from Albany, New York
Republican Party members of the New York State Assembly
21st-century American politicians
Keuka College alumni
 Occupational therapists
Year of birth missing (living people)